The St. Mary's Church Complex Historic District is a historic district located at the junction of Elm Avenue and North Monroe Street (M-125) in the city of Monroe, Michigan.  It was listed as a Michigan Historic Site and added to the National Register of Historic Places on May 6, 1982.

The complex itself consists of four buildings.  The centerpiece of the district is St. Mary Church at 117 North Monroe Street.  The church traces its origins to the St. Antoine aux Rivière Raisin, which was founded on October 15, 1788, and it is the oldest church in Monroe County.  The current site was constructed in 1834, consecrated in 1839, and renamed in 1845.  That year, the church fell under the leadership of the Roman Catholic Archdiocese of Detroit, and the Sisters, Servants of the Immaculate Heart of Mary was founded in Monroe the same year.  In 1846, St. Mary Academy was an all-girls educational facility built down the road from the church, while Monroe Catholic Central was an all-boys school built right next to the main church.  These two schools merged in 1986 to form the coeducational St. Mary Catholic Central (SMCC) high school, which stayed in the heavily expanded Monroe Catholic Central building next to the church at 108 West Elm Avenue.  It remains there to this day as the largest building in the historic district and the largest private school in the county.

The original church building remained unchanged from its completion in 1839 until it was expanded in 1903.  The Brothers of the Holy Cross residential building was constructed in 1870, and the St. Mary Parochial Elementary School was completed in 1903.  The current rectory was added to the north side of the church in the 1920s.  All of these buildings have their own unique architecture.  With only some additions to the SMCC building, the remaining buildings on the complex have remained largely unchanged since the 1920s.

The St. Mary's Church Complex Historic District is bordered to the west by Borgess Avenue, to the north by West Willow Street, to the south by Elm Avenue, and to the east by North Monroe Street (M-125) for an area of about 60 acres (24 hectares).  The district is located across Elm Avenue from the George Armstrong Custer Equestrian Monument and across North Monroe Street from the East Elm-North Macomb Street Historic District.  The church complex is also located just across the River Raisin from the Old Village Historic District.

References

External links

St. Mary Church homepage
St. Mary Middle School, part of Monroe Catholic Elementary Schools
St. Mary Catholic Central High School

Buildings and structures in Monroe, Michigan
Churches on the National Register of Historic Places in Michigan
Churches in the Roman Catholic Archdiocese of Detroit
Michigan State Historic Sites
Roman Catholic churches completed in 1839
19th-century Roman Catholic church buildings in the United States
Churches in Monroe County, Michigan
Historic districts on the National Register of Historic Places in Michigan
National Register of Historic Places in Detroit